The Domiciliary Medication Management Review (DMMR), also named as a Home Medicines Review (HMR), in an Australian scheme for the patients residing in community setting.  There are many steps included in a Home Medicine Review Service (Figure 1).

Introduced in 2001 into the Medicare Benefits Schedule (MBS) as item 900, it is aimed at preventative care.

Following an assessment of the patient's needs, a medication management plan is made.

See also 
Consultant Pharmacists' Services Research Network

Consultant Pharmacist

References 

Clinical pharmacology
Pharmacy in Australia
2001 introductions